Wide-Eyed and Simplified is the first intermediate album release (between major official releases) from Christian rock band Downhere. The album features 'live' studio recorded acoustic versions of 8 songs from Wide-Eyed and Mystified, as well as 3 other popular songs from previous releases. Each song is introduced by spoken word, which features the band members.

Track listing
 The More (Intro) – 1:45
 The More – 3:52
 Surrender  (Intro) – 1:28
 Surrender – 4:25
 A Better Way  (Intro) – 1:43
 A Better Way – 4:39
 Little Is Much  (Intro) – 2:38
 Little Is Much – 3:32
 Stir – Intro – 1:32
 Stir – 3:04
 Unbelievable  (Intro) – 2:44
 Unbelievable – 4:34
 The Real Jesus  (Intro) – 1:21
 The Real Jesus – 4:49
 Remember Me  (Intro) – 1:28
 Remember Me – 4:06
 What It's Like  (Intro) – 1:23
 What It's Like – 5:09
 Great Are You  (Intro) – 2:40
 Great Are You – 4:20
 Protest To Praise  (Intro) – 0:51
 Protest To Praise – 4:44

References                 

Downhere albums
2007 live albums